Karl Friedrich Burdach (12 June 1776 – 16 July 1847) was a German physiologist. He was born in Leipzig and died in Königsberg. He was the first to use the word "biology" and was a pioneer of neuroanatomy.

Life

Burdach came from a family of physicians in Leipzig. He graduated in medicine at Leipzig in 1800 and trained in Vienna;  became professor of physiology in the University of Dorpat in 1811, and four years later took a similar position at the University of Königsberg. He was influenced into Natural Philosophy by Friedrich Wilhelm Joseph  von Schelling  (1775- 1854).

He provided in 1822 the name, due to the arching shape of its longest fibres, of the arcuate fasciculus, the term amygdala, and in 1800 the name "Biology" in the modern sense of the term. He used the word biology and morphology as footnotes in his book Propädeutik zum Studium der gesammten Heilkunde. Burdach was an advocate of vitalism. He believed in a life force that "created the whole world and produced each living thing."

Legacy
Burdach's work on the anatomy of the brain and nervous system introduced a number of names. It was published in three volumes Vom Baue und Leben des Gehirns (1819-1826). The column of Burdach or fasciculus cuneatus, the lateral portion of the dorsal funiculus of the spinal cord is named for him. He differentiated the caudate nucleus from the putamen and identified the globus pallidus and its inner and outer segments.

Works
 Diatetik für Gesunde (1805)
 Enzyklopädie der Heilwissenschaft (three volumes, 1810–12)
 Vom Bau und Leben des Gehirns und Rückenmarks (three volumes, 1819–25)
 Neues Recepttaschenbuch für angehende Ärzte . 2., unveränd. Ausg. (1820) Digital edition by the University and State Library Düsseldorf
 Die Physiologie als Erfahrungswissenschaft (1826–40)

Notes

References
 

1776 births
1847 deaths
German science writers
German physiologists
Physicians from Leipzig
People from the Electorate of Saxony
Academic staff of the University of Königsberg
Academic staff of the University of Tartu
Corresponding members of the Saint Petersburg Academy of Sciences
German male non-fiction writers
Vitalists